The Badri 313 Battalion is a unit of the	Armed Forces of the Islamic Emirate of Afghanistan. The unit's name is closely associated with the Haqqani network, which has reportedly provided them with training. Elite Taliban units like the Badri 313 have been reported as being "critical in the taking over of Afghanistan". In July and August 2021, the Taliban released online video on the Badri 313 Battalion in various local languages, English and Arabic.

The Badri 313 Brigade is headquartered at Salahaddin Ayyubi Military Operations Academy.

Name
This unit is named after the Prophet Muhammad's army of 313 men at the Battle of Badr, an early Muslim military victory against the Quraysh which took place on March 13, 624.

History
The Haqqani network holds an important position within the Taliban's military as well as high command. The Haqqanis have traditionally called their elite forces the "Badri Army", and emphasized that these troops are ideologically closely aligned with al-Qaeda. Units termed "Army of Badr" first carried out suicide attacks and raids on positions associated with the Islamic Republic of Afghanistan and its allies in 2011.

The Badri 313 Battalion first emerged in the late stages of the Taliban insurgency, notably taking part in an attack on British security company G4S's Kabul compound in November 2018. After the 2021 Fall of Kabul, the Taliban reported that the Badri 313 Battalion were securing the Arg (the Afghani Presidential Palace) and other important sites in the city. The Badri 313 Battalion were also reported as providing "security" at the Kabul Airport.

The Badri 313 Battalion garnered worldwide attention after the Taliban victory in Afghanistan by mocking the US military by copying the Iwo Jima flag raising.

Equipment
The battalion is equipped with camouflage uniforms, combat helmets, body armor, night-vision goggles, M4 carbines, sidearms and Humvees of US origin. It is unclear how and where they acquired the equipment, either by corruption, seizure from surrendered Afghan National Army troops or simply by picking up those left behind by American troops.

References

Military units and formations of the Islamic Emirate of Afghanistan
Special forces units and formations